The 11039 / 11040 Maharashtra Express is an Express train belonging to Indian Railways that run between  and SCSMT Kolhapur in India. It operates as train number 11040 from Gondia Junction to SCSMT Kolhapur and as train number 11039 in the reverse direction.

This train is named after the state of Maharashtra. Although its name puts it in the league of trains named after their states .i.e. Kerala Express, Tamil Nadu Express, Andhra Pradesh Express etc., it does not connect the state & national capitals.

Coaches

The 11039/11040 Gondia–Kolhapur Maharashtra Express presently has 1 AC 2 tier, 2 AC 3 tier, 8 Sleeper Class & 5 Unreserved/General coaches.

It does not carry a pantry car coach.

As with most train services in India, coach composition may be amended at the discretion of Indian Railways depending on demand.

Service

As its average speed in both directions is below as per Indian Railways rules, it does not have a Express surcharge.

Traction

As the route is partly electrified, a Bhusawal-based WAP-4 loco hauls the train from  until  after which a Pune / Guntakal-based WDM-3A takes over until Kolhapur and vice versa.

Routing 

Time Table

11040 Gondia–Kolhapur Maharashtra Express leaves Gondia Junction on a daily basis and reaches Kolhapur the next day.

11039 Kolhapur–Gondia Maharashtra Express leaves Kolhapur on a daily basis and reaches Gondia Junction the next day.

External links
 Route for train no. 11039 
 Route for train no. 11040 
 http://www.irfca.org/faq/faq-trivia.html

References 

Named passenger trains of India
Rail transport in Maharashtra
Express trains in India